Transnet Freight Rail is a South African rail transport company, formerly known as Spoornet.  It was part of the South African Railways and Harbours Administration, a state-controlled organisation that employed hundreds of thousands of people for decades from the first half of the 20th century and was widely referred to by the initials SAR&H (SAS&H in Afrikaans). Customer complaints about serious problems with Transnet Freight Rail's service were reported in 2010. Its head office is in Inyanda House in Parktown, Johannesburg.

History 
Railways were first developed in the area surrounding Cape Town and later in Durban around the 1840s. The first line opened in Durban on 27 June 1850. The initial network was created to serve the agricultural production area between Cape Town and Wellington. The news that there were gold deposits in the Transvaal Republic moved the Cape Colony Government (supported by British Government) to link Kimberley as soon as possible by rail to Cape Town as part of the colonial dream.

The Central South African Railways (CSAR) was from 1902 to 1910 the operator of public railways in the Transvaal Colony and Orange River Colony in what is now South Africa. During the Anglo-Boer War, as British forces moved into the territory of the Orange Free State and the South African Republic, the Orange Free State Government Railways, the Netherlands-South African Railway Company and the Pretoria-Pietersburg Railway were taken over by the Imperial Military Railways under Lieutenant-Colonel Sir Percy Girouard. After the war had ended, the Imperial Military Railways became the Central South African Railways in July 1902, with Thomas Rees Price as general manager. With the creation of the Union of South Africa in 1910, the CSAR was merged with the Cape Government Railways and the Natal Government Railways to form the South African Railways, which is now Transnet Freight Rail.

Operations  
Transnet Freight Rail is a freight logistics and passenger transport railway.  It is the largest freight hauler in Africa.  The company comprises several businesses:

 GFB Commercial (General Freight Business) – Transnet's largest division; handles over 50% of its freight;
 Coal Line, serving coal exporters on the Mpumalanga – Richards Bay line; second largest coal railway in the world, delivering 62 million tonnes of coal (also known as "Black Gold") in the year ending 31 March 2010;
 Ore Export Line – dedicated to iron ore transport on the Sishen to Saldanha line;
 Luxrail – The operation of the Blue Train, which is designed as a five-star hotel on wheels.

Transnet also formerly owned Shosholoza Meyl, the non-luxury long-distance passenger rail service. Shosholoza Meyl was transferred to the Passenger Rail Agency of South Africa on 23 December 2008. A line in the Eastern Cape is leased to Kei Rail.

Business Units
Transnet Freight Rail is divided into 6 Business Units:

Agriculture and Bulk Liquids ("ABL")
Coal Business Unit (Coal Line)
Intermodal (Container) and Automotive Business Unit ("CAB") (Johannesburg-Durban Line)
Iron Ore and Manganese Business Unit (Kimberley-Port Elizabeth & Ore Export Line
Mineral Mining and Chrome Business Unit ("MMC") (Witbank-Komatipoort & Phalaborwa-Komatipoort Lines)
Steel and Cement Business Unit ("SAC")

The launch of the Business Units took place in a company wide event for all managerial staff on 18 April 2012.

Links to neighbouring countries

The Transnet rail network is linked to all of South Africa's neighbouring countries:
TransNamib of Namibia, at Nakop;
Botswana Railways at Ramatlabama;
National Railways of Zimbabwe and the Beitbridge Bulawayo Railway at Beitbridge;
Mozambique Ports and Railways at Ressano Garcia;
Eswatini Railways of Eswatini at Golela and Mananga;
Maseru in Lesotho on the Maseru branch line (owned by Transnet).

Ongoing projects

Maputo Corridor: Transnet Freight Rail is developing a plan with the Railroad Development Corporation to transport magnetite from Phalaborwa to Maputo as feedstock for a proposed steel plant in Maputo.
In May 2010, Transnet revealed a five-year-plan involving rail projects costing R52Bn. Most of this would be spent on new rolling stock, including 304 locomotives and 7231 wagons. R4Bn would be spent on infrastructure connecting Majuba coal-fired power station with the Richards Bay freight railway.
 Transnet is upgrading the rail corridor which connect the Port of Ngqura with manganese mines around Hotazel in the Northern Cape.
 Swazilink is expected to connect from Lothair to Sidvokodvo in Eswatini, at a cost of R17 billion.

See also 

 :Category:Locomotives of South Africa
 Hex River Tunnel
 List of South African locomotive classes
 2021 Transnet Cyberattack

References

External links 

 
 Transnet website
 South African Trains – A Pictorial Encyclopaedia

Transnet
Railway companies of South Africa